Érico de Souza (born 1 April 1947) is a Brazilian rower. He competed in the men's coxless pair event at the 1972 Summer Olympics.

References

External links
 

1947 births
Living people
Brazilian male rowers
Olympic rowers of Brazil
Rowers at the 1972 Summer Olympics
Sportspeople from Santa Catarina (state)
Pan American Games medalists in rowing
Pan American Games gold medalists for Brazil
Rowers at the 1975 Pan American Games